Global Industrial and Social Progress Research Institute (GISPRI 地球産業文化研究所) is a Japanese think tank founded in 1988 to research the global natural resources and environmental problems, international system, and interaction between industry, economy, culture, and society.  It holds the Global Industrial and Social Progress Policy Forum to make policy proposals on these problems. Also, it took over the tasks of Japan Association for the 2005 World Exposition in 2007.

Enterprise
 Research on the global natural resources and environmental problems, international system, and interaction between industry/economy and culture/society.
 Policy proposals on global problems that need to be addressed both domestically and internationally.
 Joint research programs with institutes in Japan and abroad and facilitate exchange of relevant information as well as human resources.
 Provision of information widely through symposia, seminars and publication of the "GISPRI Newsletter" and the Annual Report.

See also
 Expo 2005
 Japan Association for the 2005 World Exposition

External links
 Global Industrial and Social Progress Research Institute (GISPRI)

1988 establishments in Japan
Think tanks established in 1988
Think tanks based in Japan
Political organizations based in Japan